The Tokushima Arts Foundation for Culture（徳島県郷土文化会館） is a multi-purpose cultural facility found in the Aiba-cho district in Tokushima City, Tokushima Prefecture. It sits on the grounds of the Aibahama Park and runs alongside the Shinmachi River.

Overview

Location 
 〒770-0835　Tokushima Prefecture, Tokushima City, Aiba-cho 2-14 (徳島県徳島市藍場町2丁目14番地)
 TEL - 088-622-8121 
 FAX - 088-622-8123
 Open Hours - 9:00～21:30（Exhibitions until 17:00）
 Open Period - January 4 to December 28 every year.

Facilities 
 1F - Multi-purpose hall (792 seats)
 2F - Special exhibition room
 3F - Exhibition room
 4F - Meeting rooms, etc.
 5F - Meeting rooms, etc.

Access 
 Just eight minutes walk from the JR Tokushima Station.

External links 

 Tokushima Arts Foundation for Culture and facilities
 Tokushima Arts Foundation for Culture

Buildings and structures in Tokushima Prefecture
Tourist attractions in Tokushima Prefecture